Yuri Andreyevich Rodenkov (born 20 April 1986) is a Russian former professional footballer.

Club career
He made his debut in the Russian Premier League in 2007 for PFC Spartak Nalchik.

References

1986 births
Living people
Russian footballers
Russia under-21 international footballers
PFC Spartak Nalchik players
FC Spartak Vladikavkaz players
FC Luch Vladivostok players
Russian Premier League players
FC Salyut Belgorod players
FC Baltika Kaliningrad players
FC Sokol Saratov players
Association football forwards
FC Yenisey Krasnoyarsk players
FC Zenit Saint Petersburg players
FC Zenit-2 Saint Petersburg players